= McCarthyville, Montana =

Coordinates: 48.270°N 113.439°W

McCarthyville is an extinct town in Flathead County, in the U.S. state of Montana.

== History ==
McCarthyville was platted in 1890 by Eugene McCarthy, and named for him. At its peak, McCarthyville held 1,000 inhabitants and 32 bars, and was plagued with violence.
